Alambadi Azmi is an Indian politician and a member of 18th Uttar Pradesh Assembly representing Nizamabad constituency. He is a member of the Samajwadi Party.

Personal life
Alambadi was born on 16 March 1936 to Vadivajma Azmi in Vindaval in Azamgarh district. He studied until Intermediate and holds a diploma in Electrical and Mechanical Engineering. He is an engineer by profession. He married Kudasia Khan and has six sons.

Political career
Since 1996, Alambadi has represented the Nizamabad constituency and is a member of the Samajwadi Party. He has been a member of the 13th, 14th, 16th and 17th Legislative Assembly of Uttar Pradesh.

In the 2022 Uttar Pradesh Legislative Assembly election, Alambadi defeated Bharatiya Janata Party's Manoj by a margin of 34,187, continuing his hold on the Nizamabad constituency seat and becoming a member of the 18th Uttar Pradesh Assembly in the process.

See also
Uttar Pradesh Legislative Assembly

References

1936 births
Living people
Uttar Pradesh MLAs 2017–2022
Samajwadi Party politicians
Uttar Pradesh MLAs 2022–2027
Politicians from Azamgarh district
Samajwadi Party politicians from Uttar Pradesh